In mathematical set theory, a worldly cardinal is a cardinal κ such that the rank Vκ is a model of Zermelo–Fraenkel set theory.

Relationship to inaccessible cardinals

By Zermelo's theorem on inaccessible cardinals, every inaccessible cardinal is worldly. By Shepherdson's theorem, inaccessibility is equivalent to the stronger statement that (Vκ, Vκ+1) is a model of second order Zermelo-Fraenkel set theory.
Being worldly and being inaccessible are not equivalent; in fact, the smallest worldly cardinal has countable cofinality and therefore is a singular cardinal.

The following are in strictly increasing order, where ι is the least inaccessible cardinal:
 The least worldly κ.
 The least worldly κ and λ (κ<λ, and same below) with Vκ and Vλ satisfying the same theory.
 The least worldly κ that is a limit of worldly cardinals (equivalently, a limit of κ worldly cardinals).
 The least worldly κ and λ with Vκ ≺Σ2 Vλ (this is higher than even a κ-fold iteration of the above item).
 The least worldly κ and λ with Vκ ≺ Vλ.
 The least worldly κ of cofinality ω1 (corresponds to the extension of the above item to a chain of length ω1).
 The least worldly κ of cofinality ω2 (and so on).
 The least κ>ω with Vκ satisfying replacement for the language augmented with the (Vκ,∈) satisfaction relation.
 The least κ inaccessible in Lκ(Vκ); equivalently, the least κ>ω with Vκ satisfying replacement for formulas in Vκ in the infinitary logic L∞,ω.
 The least κ with a transitive model M⊂Vκ+1 extending Vκ satisfying Morse–Kelley set theory.
 (not a worldly cardinal) The least κ with Vκ having the same Σ2 theory as Vι.
 The least κ with Vκ and Vι having the same theory.
 The least κ with Lκ(Vκ) and Lι(Vι) having the same theory.
 (not a worldly cardinal) The least κ with Vκ and Vι having the same Σ2 theory with real parameters.
 (not a worldly cardinal) The least κ with Vκ ≺Σ2 Vι.
 The least κ with Vκ ≺ Vι.
 The least infinite κ with Vκ and Vι satisfying the same L∞,ω statements that are in Vκ.
 The least κ with a transitive model M⊂Vκ+1 extending Vκ and satisfying the same sentences with parameters in Vκ as Vι+1 does.
 The least inaccessible cardinal ι.

References

External links
Worldly cardinal in Cantor's attic

Large cardinals